Protolophus singularis is a species of harvestman in the family Protolophidae. It is found in the Western US.

References

Harvestmen
Articles created by Qbugbot
Animals described in 1893